Events in the year 1990 in the Netherlands.

Incumbents
 Monarch: Beatrix
 Prime Minister: Ruud Lubbers

Events 
 25 to 26 January – Burns' Day Storm
 February–March - Culmination of the 1989–1990 Dutch farmers' protests
 27 May – Killings of Nick Spanos and Stephen Melrose

Births
 
 
 
 
 

22 January – Michael Duut, kickboxer
16 February – Jessy Kramer, handballer.
2 April – Avalon-Chanel Weyzig, model
5 April – Género Zeefuik, footballer
15 April – Sharon Kovacs, singer
28 April – Robbert Andringa, volleyball player
5 May – Martine Smeets, handballer.
22 May – Danick Snelder, handballer.
27 June – Laura van der Heijden, handballer.
24 July – Iso Sluijters, handball player. 
17 September – Radical Redemption, DJ and record producer
21 September – Jantine Annika Heij, songwriter, vocalist, keyboardist and producer 
16 October – Sand Van Roy, actress
25 November – Anouchka Delon, actress
26 November – San Holo, DJ, musician, record producer and composer 
9 December – Debbie Bont, handballer. 
10 December – Jason Wilnis, kickboxer
12 December – Stephanie Tency, actress
21 December – Yvette Broch, handball player.

Deaths

4 January – Alois Miedl, art dealer (b. 1903)
4 January – Wim Volkers, footballer (b. 1899)
23 February – Annelien Kappeyne van de Coppello, politician (b. 1936)
27 February – Johannes Draaijer, cyclist (b. 1963)
24 May – Dries van der Lof, racing driver (b. 1919)
7 August – Phiny Dick, illustrator and writer of children's books and comics (b. 1912).
30 August – Bernard D. H. Tellegen, electrical engineer, inventor (b. 1900)

References

 
1990s in the Netherlands
Years of the 20th century in the Netherlands
Netherlands
Netherlands